Hypospila bolinoides is a species of moth in the family Erebidae first described by Achille Guenée in 1852. The species is found from the Indo-Australian tropics of India, Sri Lanka, Myanmar, Andaman Islands, China north to Japan and east to New Guinea, Queensland and the Carolines.

Description
The wingspan is 36–44 mm. Male with ciliated antennae. Cell of hindwings short. Veins 7 and 8 distorted and vein 6 given off below angle of cell. Body much darker red-brown. Palpi black with white tips. Forewings with reniform reduced to a pale speck. The postmedial line less oblique, arising from the costa before apex, and not angled. Hindwings with straight postmedial line.

The larvae feed on the young leaves of Derris species. When disturbed they drop to the ground or jump off their leaf. The body of the larvae is generally white below with a black central band and dull chocolate-brown above, banded longitudinally dorsally and subdorsally with whitish lines that incorporate pink and purplish elements. They have black head, marked with white and pink. Pupation takes place in a cell within a cut portion of a leaf which is folded over. The interior is lined with silk. The pupa has a sparse powdery bloom, giving it a bluish tint.

References

Moths described in 1852
Hypospila
Moths of Asia
Moths of Japan